Jati Agung District is an administrative district (kecamatan) in South Lampung Regency, part of Lampung Province on the island of Sumatra, Indonesia.
The district covers an area of 164.47 km2 and had a population of 128,604 at the 2020 Census, comprising 66,105 males and 62,499 females. It is situated to the north of Bandar Lampung city, and consists of twenty-one villages (rural desa and urban kelurahan), which share a postal code of 35365; many of these are suburban to Bandar Lampung. The administrative centre of the district is the town of Marga Agung.

References

Lampung
Populated places in Lampung